Bartolomeo Scappi (c. 1500 – 13 April 1577) was a famous Italian Renaissance chef. His origins had been the subject of speculation, but recent research shows that he came from the town of Dumenza in Lombardy, according to the inscription on a stone plaque in the church of Luino. Prior to this, the first known fact in his life had been that in April 1536 he organised a banquet while he was in the service of Cardinal Lorenzo Campeggio. He served several other cardinals after this, then began to serve pope Pius IV, entering the service of the Vatican kitchen. He continued to work as a chef for the pope Pius V. Scappi is often considered one of the first internationally renowned celebrity chefs.

He gained new fame in 1570 when his monumental cookbook, Opera dell'arte del cucinare, was published. In the book, he lists about 1,000 recipes of Renaissance cuisine and describes cooking techniques and tools, giving the first known picture of a fork. He declared Parmesan to be the best cheese on earth, and noted that "the liver of [a] domestic goose raised by the Jews is of extreme size and weighs [between] two and three pounds", indicating that Jews of the time were practising the overfeeding needed to produce foie gras. Reprints of Opera were continually published from 1570 to 1643.

Scappi died on 13 April 1577, and was buried in the church of SS. Vincenzo and Anastasio alla Regola, dedicated to cooks and bakers.

The Opera dell'arte del cucinare was partially translated in Spanish (Libro de cozina, 1599, by Diego Granado Maldonado) and Dutch (Koocboec oft familieren keukenboec, 1612, by Antonius Magirus).

An English translation was done by food historian Terence Scully in 2008. Another Dutch translation was done by Ika Cialona in 2015.

Notes

References
.
.
.
.
.
.

1500s births
1577 deaths
Renaissance cuisine
Italian Roman Catholics
Italian chefs
Italian food writers
Roman Catholic writers